The 100 metres distance for men in the 2008–09 ISU Speed Skating World Cup was contested over four races on four occasions, out of a total of nine World Cup occasions for the season, with the first occasion involving the distance taking place in Changchun, China, on 6–7 December 2008, and the final occasion taking place in Salt Lake City, United States, on 6–7 March 2009.

Yūya Oikawa of Japan won the cup, while Yu Fengtong of China came second, and the defending champion, Lee Kang-seok of South Korea, had to settle for third place.

Top three

Race medallists

Final standings
Standings as of 8 March 2009 (end of the season).

References

Men 0100